Madonia is a family name of Italian origin. It may refer to: 

 Danilo Madonia, Italian musician and composer 
 Ezio Madonia, Italian sprinter
 Francesco Madonia, Italian mobster
 José Gabriel Madonia, Venezuelan actor and model
 Kristen-Paige Madonia, American writer
 Luca Madonia, Italian singer-songwriter 

Italian-language surnames